Simplemente María (Simply María) is a Peruvian telenovela. It ran from 1969 to 1971. It starred Saby Kamalich playing a woman who goes from a struggling single mother trying to improve herself to being a married fashion designer. The show is cited as increasing interest in sewing and adult literacy. Saby Kamalich would be presented a gold sewing machine by the Singer Corporation as the show increased their sales in Peru.

Other characters included Esteban (Braulio Castillo) who began as her teacher and ended the series as her husband after a long relationship while Ricardo Blume played both the man who seduced her and the son the relationship produced. The show was seen as an encouragement for upward mobility. It also dealt with issues of class and ethnicity. It has been said that it was "maybe the most popular television program of all time in Peru" and it also had fans in the rest of Latin America.

Full Cast 
 Saby Kamalich  ... María Ramos
 Braulio Castillo ...Esteban 
 Ricarado Blume .... Roberto Caride -Anthony Ramos
 Elvira Travesí ... Pierina
 Mariella Trejos ... Teresa
 Regina Alcóver .... Ita
 Fernando Larrañaga...Pierre
 Carola Duval ... Ines Caride
 Inés Sánchez Aizcorbe... Angélica
 Hernan Romero ... Carlos
 Gloria María Ureta...
 Lorena Duval... Alejandra
 Liz Ureta
 Benjamin Arce
  María Isabel Chiri
  Anita Martinez
  Eduarado Cesti
  Aldo zignago
 Lucia Irurita
 Álvaro Gonzáles 
 Ricardo Tosso
 Delfina paredes
 Hudson Valdivia
 Luis Alvarez
 Orlando Sacha 
 Lola vilar
 Mari carmen Gordon
 Juan Bautista Font
 Pepe Cipolla
 Pablo Fernández 
 Martha Figueroa
 Pepe Vilar
 María Cristina Ribal
 Alfredo Bouroncle
 Alberto Soler 
 German Vegas Garay
 Carlos Gassols
 Alfonzo Kafitti
 Augusto Varillas
 Gladys Rodriguez
 Luis La Roca

References 

1969 telenovelas
1969 Peruvian television series debuts
1971 Peruvian television series endings
Peruvian telenovelas
1960s Peruvian television series
1970s Peruvian television series
Panamericana Televisión telenovelas
Spanish-language telenovelas